LTHS or Lths may refer to:

Lepanthes, a genus of orchids abbreviated by horticulturists as "Lths"

High Schools
Lacey Township High School, Lacey Township, New Jersey, USA
Lackawanna Trail High School, Factoryville, Pennsylvania, USA
Lake Travis High School, unincorporated Travis County, Texas, USA
Lockport Township High School, Lockport, Illinois, USA
Lokmanya Tilak High School, Tilak Nagar, Chembur, Mumbai, India
Lyons Township High School, La Grange, Illinois, USA
Lebanon Trail High School, Frisco, Texas USA